The Greek Catholic Eparchy of Nyíregyháza is an eparchy (diocese) of the Greek Catholic Church in Hungary, an Eastern Catholic church which uses the Byzantine Rite in the Hungarian language.

It has its cathedral episcopal see, Szent Miklós Görögkatolikus székesegyház, in Nyíregyháza (Hungary). It is a suffragan of the Greek Catholic Archeparchy of Hajdúdorog, a Metropolitanate sui juris and the Greek Catholics in Hungary' only province.

History 
It was created by the Holy See on 20 March 2015, on territory split off from the then Hungarian Catholic Eparchy of Hajdúdorog, which at the same time was elevated to an Archeparchy and became Nyíregyházai's Metropolitan, the other suffragan being the former Apostolic Exarchate of Miskolc, which was simultaneously promoted to Eparchy.

Eparchial Bishops

Apostolic administrators:
 Atanáz Orosz, bishop of Miskolc  (20 Mar 2015 – 31 Oct 2015)
 Fr. Ábel Szocska, O.S.B.M. (31 Oct 2015 – 7 Apr 2018)
Eparchial Bishops:
 Ábel Szocska, O.S.B.M. (since 7 Apr 2018)

Source and External links 
 GigaCatholic with episcopal incumbent biography links

Eastern Catholic dioceses in Hungary
Eastern Catholicism in Hungary
2015 establishments in Hungary